HDMS Ingolf has been used as a name for three ships of the Royal Danish Navy:

, a steam gunboat, launched in 1876 and decommissioned in 1926.
, a fisheries inspection ship, launched in 1933, seized by the Kriegsmarine in 1943 and sunk in Kiel in an Allied air raid.
, a Hvidbjornen-class offshore patrol frigate, launched in 1962 and decommissioned in 1991.

References

Royal Danish Navy ship names